Second Manohar Lal Khattar ministry is the Council of Ministers in Haryana, a state in North India headed by Manohar Lal Khattar of the BJP from 27 October 2019.

In the current government, the Chief Minister belongs to the BJP, while the Deputy Chief Minister belongs to the JJP. Here is the list of ministers

Council of Ministers

Ministers of state

References

Cabinets established in 2019
2019 establishments in Haryana
Khattar 02
Lists of current Indian state and territorial ministries
Bharatiya Janata Party state ministries
Jannayak Janta Party